Koprivnica is a city in Northern Croatia, located 70 kilometers northeast of Zagreb. It is the capital and the largest city of the Koprivnica-Križevci county. In 2011, the city's administrative area of 90.94 km2 had a total population of 30,854, with 23,955 in the city proper.

Population

The list of settlements in the Koprivnica municipality is:

 Bakovčica, population 321
 Draganovec, population 506
 Herešin, population 728
 Jagnjedovec, population 344
 Koprivnica, population 23,955
 Kunovec Breg, population 641
 Reka, population 1,507
 Starigrad, population 2,386
 Štaglinec, population 466

Geography
Koprivnica (German: Kopreinitz, Hungarian: Kapronca) is situated at a strategic location – on the slopes of Bilogora and Kalnik to the south and river Drava to the north. Its position enabled it to develop numerous amenities for the wider area such as trade, crafts and administration, and in the 13th century Koprivnica became a town settlement. Koprivnica was named after the stream of the same name, which was first mentioned at the beginning of the 13th century during the Hungarian Kingdom.

Education

Universities
Koprivnica and Varaždin took part in establishing the University North, a public national university that operates in both cities since 2015.

University North (University centre Koprivnica)
Department of Media and Communication
Department of Environmental protection, recycling and packaging
Department of Communication, Media and Journalism
Department of Logistics and Sustainable Mobility
Department of Business and Management
Department of Food Technology
Department of Art Studies
Department of Computing and Informatics

History

Koprivnica has a history similar to that of nearby Varaždin: it was first mentioned in 1272 in a document by prince László IV and declared a free royal town by king Lajos I in 1356, and flourished as a trading place and a military fortress since that time.

In the 14th century, the town settlement further developed due to increased trade under the influence of Varaždin. During the construction of Renaissance fortification in the second half of the 16th century Koprivnica was the centre of the Slavonian military border. Koprivnica counted among its troops musketeers, German soldiers, hussars and infantry. At that time the Renaissance square emerged together with the Town hall which emphasized its Renaissance identity, so Koprivnica can today be legitimately considered a renaissance town.

The military aspect set it back somewhat when it was included in the Military Frontier in the 16th century during the wars with the Ottoman Turks, but after Maria Theresia's decree of 1765 it resumed life as a peaceful little merchant town which it was in reality.

Its position on the border of Habsburg monarchy and Ottoman Empire influenced the environment, economic, social and demographic changes, as well as everyday life. Koprivnica can therefore be considered a border town. In the second half of the 17th century Koprivnica was among the most developed royal towns in the Croatian-Slavonian Kingdom and its economic growth was initially based on strong trade activity. The fact that the three most significant churches (St. Nicholas, St. Anthony of Padua with the Franciscan monastery and church of the Assumption of Virgin Mary in Mocile further illustrates the economic power of the town in the 17th century. Economic activity was moved outside the town fortifications and this resulted in the wide and spacious baroque squares – today's Zrinski square and Jelačić square. At the same time the oldest streets evolved and they established the development base for the town until the present day.

In the 19th century, the old Renaissance and Baroque housing and buildings associated with trade were replaced by the now historical architecture and the new town centre acquired its present appearance. In 1863, the main part of the future town park was planted, and the removal of the old fortification together with the construction of the railway determined the regional development of the town. Railway connections enabled the development of industry and further established Koprivnica as a leading centre of the Podravina region. The Koprivnica Synagogue was built in 1875 in the centre of Koprivnica. Today it is listed as a cultural monument.

In the late 19th century and early 20th century, Koprivnica was a district capital in the Bjelovar-Križevci County of the Kingdom of Croatia-Slavonia. The first concentration and extermination camp established in the Independent State of Croatia during World War II was the Danica concentration camp established in Koprivnica.

Koprivnica developed significantly in the 20th century with the advent of the Podravka food industry, known worldwide for its Vegeta spice. They even have a museum devoted to the firm of Podravka.

The annual "motifs of Podravina" event is when the whole town becomes a gallery of naïve art. Many of the greatest Croatian naïve artists come from the villages along the Drava in this county, notably Ivan Generalić.

Notable people
 Vanna
 Zlata Bartl
 Ivan Brkić
 Stjepan Brodarić
 Žarko Dolinar
 Ivica Hiršl
 Baltazar Dvorničić Napuly
 Ivan Generalić
 Ivan Golac
 Slavko Löwy
 Armin Schreiner
 Milivoj Solar
 Dejan Šomoci
 Branko Švarc

Sources
 
 
 
 Rudolf Horvat, "Povijest slob. i kr. grada Koprivnice", Zagreb, 1943.
 Leander Brozović, "Građa za povijest Koprivnice", crteži i skice Stjepan Kukec, Koprivnica 1978.
 Milan Prelog, Ivanka Reberski, ur., Koprivnica – grad i spomenici, Zagreb 1986. 
 Nada Klaić, "Koprivnica u srednjem vijeku", Koprivnica 1987.
 Dragutin Feletar, "Podravina : općine Đurđevac, Koprivnica i Ludbreg u prošlosti i sadašnjosti", Koprivnica : Centar za kulturu, 1988.
 
 Mirela Slukan Altić, ur., Povijesni atlas gradova - Koprivnica, Zagreb-Koprivnica 2005.

Gallery

References

External links

 

 
Populated places in Koprivnica-Križevci County
Bjelovar-Križevci County
Cities and towns in Croatia
13th-century establishments in Croatia
1272 establishments in Europe
Populated places established in the 13th century